The 	Ririe Community Hall, at 455 Main St. in Ririe, Idaho, was listed on the National Register of Historic Places in 2019.

It is a one-story log building built in 1933–35, funded by the Federal Emergency Relief Administration.

It was the only recreational facility in Ririe until 1967.  It was used by physical education classes, by bands and choirs, and by dance classes of the high school and elementary school, and it was used for community events as well.

References

See also
 List of National Historic Landmarks in Idaho
 National Register of Historic Places listings in Jefferson County, Idaho

Log buildings and structures on the National Register of Historic Places in Idaho
Buildings and structures in Jefferson County, Idaho
National Register of Historic Places in Jefferson County, Idaho
Community centers in the United States